Huntington High School is a public high school located in Huntington, Texas (USA) and classified as a 4A school by the UIL. It is part of the Huntington Independent School District located in south central Angelina County. In 2013, the school was rated "Met Standard" by the Texas Education Agency.

Athletics
The Huntington Red Devils compete in the following sports 

Baseball
Basketball
Cross Country
Golf
Football
Powerlifting
Softball
Swimming
Tennis
Track and Field
Volleyball

State Titles
Boys Basketball 
1959(1A), 1960(1A), 1962(B), 1974(1A)
Softball 
2008(3A)

References

External links
 Huntington ISD

Schools in Angelina County, Texas
Public high schools in Texas